Colin Kaywood Garrett (born July 6, 2000) is an American professional racing driver who currently competes in the TC America Series in TCX for Rooster Hall Racing in a BMW M2 CS Cup car. He has also competed in the NASCAR Xfinity Series, NASCAR Camping World Truck Series, NASCAR K&N Pro Series East (now the ARCA Menards Series East) and the CARS Tour in the past.

NASCAR
Garrett began racing in 2015 at the age of 14, competing in the Pure Stock division at South Boston Speedway. He was awarded the UNOH Youth Achievement Award in 2016 and 2017 at SoBo and in 2017 won the NASCAR Whelen All-American Series Limited Late Model division championship at SoBo. In 2017, he also competed in select Late Model Stock Car events at numerous tracks, earning two pole awards and a win at Dominion Raceway.

K&N Pro Series East

Garrett ran 12 of the 14 races in 2018, driving the No. 18 Toyota for Hunt-Sellers Racing. His highest finish was P3 in the season’s fourth race at South Boston Speedway. The team ran a Days of Thunder throwback scheme for the King Cadillac GMC Throwback 100 at Thompson Speedway Motorsports Park, imitating Russ Wheeler's paint scheme. Garrett's 2018 season was originally supposed to be a part-time effort with sporadic races throughout the year, but eventually expanded to include all of the races from Langley on forward.

In 2019, Garrett returned to Sam Hunt Racing and the No. 18, but switched from Toyota to Chevrolet. They competed in 10 of 12 events with a best finish of P6.

Xfinity Series
In April 2019, Garrett made his debut in the NASCAR Xfinity Series. He drove the No. 66 Toyota for MBM Motorsports at Richmond Raceway. They started P24 and finished P26, three laps down.

For the 2019 NASCAR Xfinity Series finale at Homestead-Miami Speedway, Garrett and Sam Hunt Racing made their first start together in the series. They started P15 and finished P21, one lap down.

Garrett would go on to drive part-time for Sam Hunt Racing in the Xfinity Series in 2020 and 2021.

Truck Series
Garrett ran his first NASCAR Gander Outdoors Truck Series race in the 2019 World of Westgate 200 at Las Vegas Motor Speedway, driving the No. 38 Chevrolet for Niece Motorsports starting P21 and finishing P24, 3 laps down, due to transmission issues. 

He returned to Niece and the Truck Series in October 2020 at Kansas Speedway starting P20 and finishing P24, 4 laps down, after being involved in an early crash.

On June 8, 2022, it was announced that Garrett would drive the No. 30 truck for On Point Motorsports in the DoorDash 250 at Sonoma, replacing Tate Fogleman, who had been scheduled to drive that truck full-time in 2022 but was taken out of the truck for this race. However, due to the late notice of this opportunity, Garrett was unable to receive his drug test back in time to be able to compete. Josh Bilicki filled in starting P26 and finishing P30 due to a crash.

Touring Car

TC America
In 2022, it was announced that Garrett would compete full time in the TC America Series which is run under the SRO Motorsports Group banner for Rooster Hall Racing where he would be teammates with 3x Guinness Book of World Records holder Johan Schwartz who is competing in GT4 America. Garrett took behind the wheel of his BMW M2 CS Cup TCX car at Sonoma Raceway for the first time in April, finishing P5 in his first race. However in race 2, it was learned that the tire manufacturer did not bring the needed amount of tires for all competitors. Garrett would be the only car starting on scuffs and would go on to finish P6.

The second event of the season was originally scheduled to be held at Ozark Raceway Park but was changed to NOLA Motorsports Park, where Garrett would pick up his first win of the season in just his third start. He finished P2 on Sunday in the fourth race of the schedule. 

The third stop of the season was at Garrett’s hometown track of VIRginia International Raceway where Garrett would set a new track record in qualifying and take the win in the fifth race of the season. On Sunday he finished P3. 

At Watkins Glen he would take home the win on Saturday and P3 on Sunday, which was the eighth race of the season and the start of the second half of the championship.

Motorsports career results

NASCAR
(key) (Bold – Pole position awarded by qualifying time. Italics – Pole position earned by points standings or practice time. * – Most laps led.)

Xfinity Series

Camping World Truck Series

K&N Pro Series East

 Season still in progress 
 Ineligible for series points

References

External links
 

2000 births
Living people
NASCAR drivers
Racing drivers from Virginia